Mitch Grigg (born 2 January 1993) is a former professional Australian rules footballer who played for the Adelaide Football Club in the Australian Football League (AFL). He was recruited from Norwood Football Club in the South Australian National Football League (SANFL) with selection 41 in the 2011 national draft. He won the Magarey Medal in 2017 and 2018 playing for the Norwood Football Club making him the first player born in 1993 to receive the Magarey Medal.

AFL career
Grigg did not play an AFL game in 2012, instead playing for the  senior and reserves sides in the SANFL. He made his debut late the next season, in round 17 against , after showing strong form in the SANFL. In five games in 2013 he averaged an impressive 16 possessions, returning to Norwood for the finals where he helped them to a premiership. He also re-signed with the club for two years.

Grigg struggled to break into the side in 2014 and 2015, hampered by the substitute rule and untimely injuries, but he performed well in the SANFL for Adelaide's new reserves side, polling the most Magarey Medal votes for the club in both seasons.  At the conclusion of the 2016 season, he was delisted by Adelaide without an AFL game being played for the 2016 AFL Season. After he was delisted by the Crows, he returned to the Norwood in the SANFL, the club he played for prior to being drafted by the Adelaide Football Club.

SANFL career

Since returning to Norwood in 2017, Grigg has won back-to-back Magarey Medals and was awarded the Jack Oatey Medal after the 2018 SANFL Grand Final, the first player in SANFL history to be awarded the medal whilst playing for the losing side.

Statistics

|- style="background:#eaeaea;"
! scope="row" style="text-align:center" | 2013
|
| 38 || 5 || 6 || 2 || 53 || 28 || 81 || 12 || 17 || 1.2 || 0.4 || 10.6 || 5.6 || 16.2 || 2.4 || 3.4
|-
! scope="row" style="text-align:center" | 2014
|
| 38 || 9 || 6 || 6 || 67 || 38 || 105 || 25 || 15 || 0.7 || 0.7 || 7.4 || 4.2 || 11.7 || 2.8 || 1.7
|- style="background:#eaeaea;"
! scope="row" style="text-align:center" | 2015
|
| 8 || 6 || 3 || 4 || 69 || 34 || 103 || 30 || 20 || 0.5 || 0.7 || 11.5 || 5.7 || 17.2 || 5.0 || 3.0
|-
! scope="row" style="text-align:center" | 2016
|
| 8 || 0 || — || — || — || — || — || — || — || — || — || — || — || — || — || —
|- class="sortbottom"
! colspan=3| Career
! 20
! 15
! 12
! 189
! 100
! 289
! 67
! 52
! 0.8
! 0.6
! 9.5
! 5.0
! 14.5
! 3.4
! 2.6
|}

References

External links

Living people
1993 births
Adelaide Football Club players
Norwood Football Club players
Australian rules footballers from South Australia
Adelaide Football Club (SANFL) players